The Florida Film Critics Circle Award for Best Foreign Language Film is an award given by the Florida Film Critics Circle to honor the finest achievements in film-making.

Winners

1990s

2000s

2010s

2020s 

Florida Film Critics Circle Awards
Lists of films by award
Film awards for Best Foreign Language Film